Mordellistena rhizophorae is a species of beetle in the genus Mordellistena of the family Mordellidae. It was described by Lea in 1925.

References

Beetles described in 1925
rhizophorae